Gugua was the King of Kano from 1247 to 1290. He was the son of Gijimasu and Munsada.

Succession
Gugua was succeeded by Shekkarau I.

Biography in the Kano Chronicle
Below is a biography of Gugua from Palmer's 1908 English translation of the Kano Chronicle.

References

13th-century monarchs in Africa
Monarchs of Kano
1290 deaths